Joanna Woś is a Polish operatic coloratura soprano.

Joanna Woś has a sonorous intonation voice with a very wide range (ranging freely high F6). She has been nicknamed "Queen of italian bel canto" by critics and audience. Graduate of the Academy of Music in Łódź. Laureate of major vocal competitions in Poland, winner of 1st prize in the International Vocal Competition in Bilbao. Multiple laureated of the Golden Masks (music critics awards).She made her debut on the stage of the Grand Theatre in Łódź with the title part to Donizetti’s Lucia di Lammermoor.
Joanna Woś has performed with the Polish National Opera, the Cracow Opera, the Grand Theatre in Poznań, the National Philharmonic and the Cracow Philharmonic. She has appeared in guest performances at the Alte Oper Frankfurt, Deutsche Oper Berlin, the Auditorium in Rome, the Galina Vishnevskaya Opera Centre in Moscow, the National Opera in Vilnius, the National Opera in Zagreb, the Royal Festival Hall with London Symphony Orchestra and on other opera and concert stages in Europe, U.S. and Russia. In April 2010 she recorded for the BBC, Symphony No. 3 by Henryk M. Gorecki with the London Symphony Orchestra conducted by Marin Alsop at the Royal Festival Hall in London. In 2013 the Grand Theatre in Lodz staged especially for her Donizetti’s “Anna Bolena”.

Performances 

 The Magic Flute as The Queen of the Night
 Lucia di Lammermoor as Lucia
 Rigoletto as Gilda
 Maria Stuarda as Maria Stuarda
 La traviata as Violetta
 Don Giovanni as Donna Anna
 I puritani as Elvira
 Don Pasquale as Norina
 The Barber of Seville as Rosina
 Lucrezia Borgia as Lucrezia Borgia
 Anna Bolena as Anna Bolena
 Orfeo ed Euridice as Euridice
 La rondine as Magda
 Così fan tutte as Fiordiligi
 The Tales of Hoffmann as Olympia
 Un ballo in maschera as Oscar
 The Marriage of Figaro as Rosina
 I Capuleti e i Montecchi as Giulietta
 Falstaff as Nannetta
 The Golden Cockerel as Queen of Shemakha
 Life with an Idiot as Wife
 The Haunted Manor as Hanna
 L'elisir d'amore as Adina
 La bohème as Musetta
 La voix humaine as She
 La Bohème as Musetta
 A Streetcar Named Desire (opera)A Streetcar Named Desire as Blanche DuBois
 Madame Butterfly (opera) as Madame Butterfly (Cio-cio-san)
 Norma (opera) as Norma

Concerts 
Stabat Mater - (K. Szymanowski; G.Rossini; G. Pergolesi), Messe Solennelle - Ch.Gounod, Requiem - (G. Fauré; G. Rossini), Exultate Jubilate - W.Mozart, Carmina Burana - C.Orff.

Discography
2016: Opera Arias - Poniatowski CD
2016: Joanna Woś śpiewa/sings CD
2016: Hearkening to the universe CD

References

External links

Official website

Living people
Musicians from Kielce
Polish operatic sopranos
21st-century Polish women opera singers
20th-century Polish women opera singers
Year of birth missing (living people)